Dennis Giannini (born July 13, 1950) is a Canadian former professional ice hockey left winger who played eight seasons in the American Hockey League (AHL), Western Hockey League (WHL) and the Italian Serie A. He was selected by the Philadelphia Flyers in the 6th round (74th overall) of the 1970 NHL Amateur Draft.

Career statistics

Awards and honours
WHL 2nd All-Star Team (1973–74)

External links

Dennis Giannini's profile at Hockey Draft Central

1950 births
Baltimore Clippers players
Canadian ice hockey left wingers
Cleveland Barons (1937–1973) players
HC Valpellice players
Living people
London Knights players
New Haven Nighthawks players
Sportspeople from Kirkland Lake
Philadelphia Flyers draft picks
Portland Buckaroos players
Quebec Aces (AHL) players
Rhode Island Reds players
St. Catharines Black Hawks players
Ice hockey people from Ontario
Canadian expatriate ice hockey players in Italy